Mamdum Dickson Seldum (born ) is a Nigerian male weightlifter, competing in the 77 kg category and representing Nigeria at international competitions. He won the silver medal at the 2015 African Games, lifting a total of 320 kg. He participated at the 2014 Commonwealth Games in the 77 kg event.

Major competitions

References

1992 births
Living people
Nigerian male weightlifters
Place of birth missing (living people)
Weightlifters at the 2014 Commonwealth Games
Commonwealth Games competitors for Nigeria
African Games silver medalists for Nigeria
African Games medalists in weightlifting
Competitors at the 2015 African Games
Competitors at the 2019 African Games
African Games bronze medalists for Nigeria
20th-century Nigerian people
21st-century Nigerian people